Diablo (Spanish for "Devil") is a census-designated place (CDP) in Contra Costa County, California, United States. The population was 1,158 at the 2010 census.

Geography

History
A post office was established at Diablo in 1916.

Demographics

2010
At the 2010 census Diablo had a population of 1,158. The racial makeup of Diablo was 1,065 (92.0%) White, 1 (0.1%) African American, 2 (0.2%) Native American, 55 (4.7%) Asian, 0 (0.0%) Pacific Islander, 5 (0.4%) from other races, and 30 (2.6%) from two or more races. Hispanic or Latino of any race were 39 people (3.4%).

The census reported that 1,102 people (95.2% of the population) lived in households, 56 (4.8%) lived in non-institutionalized group quarters, and no one was institutionalized.

There were 412 households, 135 (32.8%) had children under the age of 18 living in them, 315 (76.5%) were opposite-sex married couples living together, 17 (4.1%) had a female householder with no husband present, 11 (2.7%) had a male householder with no wife present.  There were 8 (1.9%) unmarried opposite-sex partnerships, and 1 (0.2%) same-sex married couples or partnerships. 57 households (13.8%) were one person and 31 (7.5%) had someone living alone who was 65 or older. The average household size was 2.67.  There were 343 families (83.3% of households); the average family size was 2.96.

The age distribution was 275 people (23.7%) under the age of 18, 57 people (4.9%) aged 18 to 24, 149 people (12.9%) aged 25 to 44, 423 people (36.5%) aged 45 to 64, and 254 people (21.9%) who were 65 or older.  The median age was 49.3 years. For every 100 females, there were 94.9 males.  For every 100 females age 18 and over, there were 95.4 males.

There were 439 housing units at an average density of ,of which 412 were occupied, 380 (92.2%) by the owners and 32 (7.8%) by renters.  The homeowner vacancy rate was 1.8%; the rental vacancy rate was 3.0%.  1,033 people (89.2% of the population) lived in owner-occupied housing units and 69 people (6.0%) lived in rental housing units.

2000
At the 2000 census there were 988 people, 341 households, and 308 families in the CDP. The racial makeup of the CDP was 94.64% White, 0.61% Black or African American, 2.94% Asian, 0.61% from other races, and 1.21% from two or more races.  3.54% of the population were Hispanic or Latino of any race.
In terms of real estate prices, Forbes magazine rated Diablo the fourth most expensive ZIP code in the United States.

Of the 341 households 37.8% had children under the age of 18 living with them, 85.3% were married couples living together, 3.5% had a female householder with no husband present, and 9.4% were non-families. 8.2% of households were one person and 4.7% were one person aged 65 or older.  The average household size was 2.90 and the average family size was 3.03.

The age distribution was 26.8% under the age of 18, 3.8% from 18 to 24, 17.1% from 25 to 44, 38.6% from 45 to 64, and 13.7% 65 or older.  The median age was 46 years. For every 100 females, there were 96.0 males.  For every 100 females age 18 and over, there were 90.3 males.

The median household income was $197,904 and the median family income  was in excess of $200,000. Males had a median income of $190,000 versus $62,614 for females. The per capita income for the CDP was $95,419.  None of the population or families were below the poverty line.

See also
Mount Diablo

References

Census-designated places in Contra Costa County, California
Mount Diablo
Census-designated places in California